Sawari Jawaharnagar is a census town in Bhandara district in the Indian state of Maharashtra.

Demographics
 India census, Sawari Jawharnagar had a population of 11,965. Males constitute 52% of the population and females 48%. Sawari Jawharnagar has an average literacy rate of 84%, higher than the national average of 59.5%: male literacy is 89%, and female literacy is 78%. In Sawari Jawharnagar, 8% of the population is under 6 years of age.

References

Cities and towns in Bhandara district